"Crossing the Bar" is an 1889 poem by Alfred, Lord Tennyson. It is considered that Tennyson wrote it in elegy; the narrator uses an extended metaphor to compare death with crossing the "sandbar" between the river of life, with its outgoing "flood", and the ocean that lies beyond death, the "boundless deep", to which we return.

Overview
Tennyson is believed to have written the poem (after suffering a serious illness) while on the sea, crossing the Solent from Aldworth to Farringford on the Isle of Wight. Separately, it has been suggested he may have written it on a yacht anchored in Salcombe, where there is a moaning sandbar. "The words", he said, "came in a moment". Shortly before he died, Tennyson told his son Hallam to "put 'Crossing the Bar' at the end of all editions of my poems".

The poem contains four stanzas that generally alternate between long and short lines. Tennyson employs a traditional ABAB rhyme scheme. Scholars have noted that the form of the poem follows the content: the wavelike quality of the long-then-short lines parallels the narrative thread of the poem.

The extended metaphor of "crossing the bar" represents travelling serenely and securely from life through death. The Pilot is a metaphor for God, whom the speaker hopes to meet face to face. Tennyson explained, "The Pilot has been on board all the while, but in the dark I have not seen him…[He is] that Divine and Unseen Who is always guiding us."

Set to music
The words were set to music in April 1890 as a song for high voice and piano by Charles Villiers Stanford and as a hymn, "Freshwater", for four-part chorus by Sir Hubert Parry (publ. 1893). Other settings include those by Sir Joseph Barnby, Geoffrey Shaw, Charles Ives, Gwyneth Van Anden Walker and John Philip Sousa.

In 2012 the poem was set to music by Rani Arbo, with a subsequent choral arrangement by Peter Amidon. A slightly rearranged version of the latter was later produced by The Spooky Men's Chorale and included on their album called Warm.

Text

In popular culture
The poem is humorously referenced in Walt Disney's 1942 Goofy cartoon The Olympic Champ; while Goofy haphazardly attempts the pole vault, the narrator states that the track-and-field event reminds him of Tennyson's "Crossing the Bar", and quotes the poem's first stanza.

In the darkly humorous "We Will All Go Together When We Go", humourist/songwriter Tom Lehrer sings of a humanity-ending nuclear holocaust; the song includes the line, "and let there be no moaning of the bar", implying that no one will be left to mourn the war's victims.

The poem has also found its way into the DLC Frozen Wilds of the videogame Horizon Zero Dawn, where it is mentioned as the favourite poem of the AI CYAN.

Notes

External links

"Crossing the Bar" poem text

Poetry by Alfred, Lord Tennyson
British poems
1889 poems
Poems about death